Sadovy is a rural locality (a settlement) in Navlinsky District, Bryansk Oblast, Russia. The population was 97 as of 2010. There is 1 street.

Geography 
Sadovy is located 16 km north of Navlya (the district's administrative centre) by road. Klyukovniki is the nearest rural locality.

References 

Rural localities in Navlinsky District